Prebisch is a surname. Notable people with the surname include:

 Alberto Prebisch (1899–1970), Argentine architect
 Raúl Prebisch (1901–1986), Argentine economist

German-language surnames